Fort Fordyce Nature Reserve is a nature reserve in Eastern Cape  Province, South Africa that is managed by Eastern Cape Parks, and has an area of .

It was established as a National Reserve in 1987.

175 species of birds have been recorded in the park.

See also

References 

Eastern Cape Provincial Parks
Protected areas of the Eastern Cape